Florian Lobilo Boba (born 10 April 1950) is a Congolese football defender who played for Zaire in the 1974 FIFA World Cup.

Career
Lobilo played for AS Vita Club, where he would win the 1973 African Cup of Champions Clubs.

He was in the Zaire squad that won the 1974 African Cup of Nations finals.

He made several appearances for Zaire in 1974 World Cup qualifying and appeared in one 1982 World Cup qualifying match; a 5-2 win over Mozambique on 13 July 1980.

In 2006, he was selected by CAF as one of the best 200 African football players of the last 50 years.

References

External links
FIFA profile

1950 births
Living people
Africa Cup of Nations-winning players
Democratic Republic of the Congo footballers
Democratic Republic of the Congo international footballers
Association football defenders
AS Vita Club players
1974 FIFA World Cup players
1974 African Cup of Nations players
1976 African Cup of Nations players
21st-century Democratic Republic of the Congo people